Luis Armando Lozada Cruz (born September 8, 1971), known by his stage name Vico C, is an American rapper and record producer. Regarded as the founding father of reggaeton, Vico C has played an influential role in the development of Latin American hip hop and urban music.

Biography

Early life and influence
He was born in New York and raised in Puerto Rico. Nicknamed El Filósofo del Rap, ("The Philosopher of Rap"), Luis Armando Lozada Cruz adopted the professional name Vico C.  Vico C describes reggaeton as "essentially hip-hop but with a flavor more compatible to the Caribbean." 

As one of the founders of hip hop in Spanish, Vico C was able to show that it was possible for one to be able to rap entirely and compellingly in Spanish using just occasional English phrases or slang terms. He can be seen in the rap movement as far back as its "underground" days ghostwriting and producing music for other young performers in the Puerto Rican rap scene.

Vico C grew up in the Puerta de Tierra barrio in San Juan. He got enrolled in acting classes by the age of nine and began his professional rapping career in 1985. At first, he used to go to bodegas (grocery stores) or pharmacies, buy home recording tapes, record himself singing his songs and then sell the tapes to friends or family.  Vico C was discovered by DJ Negro in 1985 whom immediately saw the great potential of hip hop in Spanish and chose to record Vico's earliest demos.  Upon the positive reaction from the barrio, DJ Negro brought Vico to the most successful hip hop promoter in Puerto Rico, Jorge Oquendo (also known as 'El Sexy Boy').  Jorge Oquendo formed the record label 'Prime Records' with Vico C as the lead artist of the label.  Prime Records eventually received a distribution deal via Sony BMG Latin.  Prime Records is one of the most successful and influential record labels in the history of Spanish rap and reggaeton known for being the home to legendary acts such as DJ Negro, Vico- C, El General, Lisa M, Falo, Brewley MC and more.

In May 2019 he suffered seizures resulting from an allergic reaction to medication and was hospitalized but recovered.

Career
In 1988, Spanish rap in Puerto Rico was not at a popular high, and Vico-C was the first one to rap in Spanish in Puerto Rico, considered the Godfather of Spanish Hip Hop and the pioneer of this genre, there were others who followed in his footsteps, rapping in the ghettos. Brewley MC, Piro JM, Jimmy MC, Bimbo, (Lisa M, Jelly Dee Franceska, came afterward) Ruben DJ was the first rapper to sound on the radio by releasing "La Escuela" after Vico C fame was already known on the whole island for his underground lyrics. Brewley MC also recorded "El Sida Rap with Green Records". Vico C entered the charts with his song "La Recta Final" which he personally designed the album cover for, with his artistic talents. Vico C was signed to Prime Records and started touring to venues in New York, Chicago, Miami, Mexico, Venezuela, El Salvador, Panama, the Dominican Republic.

Vico C, in 1992 released his singles "Saborealo" and "María" which became gold and platinum albums, respectively. In 1994, he established his own record company VC Records, promoting such singers as Lissy Estrella, Francheska, and Lisa M who were originally his back up dancers. In 1990, Vico C was involved in a near-fatal motorcycle accident. His injuries led to his abuse of heroin, cocaine, and alcohol.

Soon after, he became an evangelical Christian and went into a voluntary semi-retirement. In 1998, he resurfaced, with the "rambunctious", Christian rap CD Aquel Que Había Muerto. The new CD went gold and in 1999, he returned to the touring scene with his concert Antes y después. Soon after, he released a sequel to Aquel Que Había Muerto. With that, he earned the Latino Rap of the year award by Billboard.

In 2003, Vico C released an album titled En Honor a la Verdad. While it was not a major hit it still sold well and one of the album's singles "El Bueno, El Malo y El Feo", referring to Eddie Dee, himself and Tego Calderón respectively. The single was widely heard. The single was a great combination of the best "Conscience" subgenre of rap artists.

Vico C's recent albums include Desahogo, in early 2005. The album was a success and born June 3, 2006, he came back with another concert, El Encuentro.

Many consider Vico C to be a pioneer of rap. Music industry figures called him the "father and creator of rap". He has worked alongside artists including Big Boy, Eddie Dee, Héctor & Tito, Tego Calderón. He has also worked with producers Baby Ranks, Tony Touch and Luny Tunes.

He has sung alongside salsa singer Gilberto Santa Rosa and cumbia group Kumbia Kings.

Vico C tries to maintain a Christian theme throughout his music. His brother Jay Lozada is a salsa musician.

In 2020 music by Vico C was part of the annual Banco Popular Christmas songs compilation album.

Legacy
Vico C is renowned as the most influential artist in the history of Spanish Hip Hop and Reggaeton throughout Latin America and Spain.  Vico is recognized for having lyrics that were thoughtful, insightful, socially conscious as well as catchy and danceable songs for all kind of audiences.  The musical blueprint implemented by DJ Negro and Vico C is the precursor of the genre now known as reggaeton.  Many Spanish hip hop/reggaeton journalists and experts consider Vico C as the greatest or one of the greatest artists in the history of the genre.

Albums

Studio albums
 Misión La Cima (1990)
 Hispanic Soul (1991)
 Xplosión (1993)
 Con poder (1996)
 Aquel Que Había Muerto (1998)
 Emboscada (2002)
 En Honor a la Verdad (2003)
 Desahogo (2005)
 Babilla (2009)
 TBA (2023)

Accolades

American Society of Composers, Authors and Publishers Awards 

!
|-
!scope="row"|2017
|Vico C
|Vanguard Award
|
|
|}

Billboard Latin Music Awards

Grammy Awards 

!
|-
!scope="row"|2006
|Desahogo
|Best Latin Rock, Urban or Alternative Album
|
|
|}

Latin Grammy Awards 

!
|-
!scope="row"|2002
|Vivo
|rowspan=5|Best Urban Music Album
|
|
|-
!scope="row"|2003
|Emboscada
|
|
|-
!scope="row"|2004
|En Honor a la Verdad
|
|
|-
!scope="row"|2005
|Desahogo
|
|
|-
!scope="row" rowspan="2"|2010
|Babilla
|
|rowspan="2"|
|-
|"Sentimiento"
|rowspan="2"|Best Urban Song
|
|-
!scope="row"|2017
|"Papá"
|
|
|}

Latin Songwriters Hall of Fame 

!
|-
!scope="row"|2016
|rowspan="2"|Vico C
|rowspan="2"|Latin Songwriters Hall of Fame – Performer
|
|
|-
!scope="row"|2018
|
|
|}

Lo Nuestro Awards 

!
|-
!scope="row"|2003
|Emboscada
|Urban Album of the Year
|
|
|-
!scope="row" rowspan="2"|2006
|Desahogo
|Urban Album of the Year
|
|rowspan="2"|
|-
|"Desahogo"
|Video of the Year
|
|}

See also
 List of Puerto Rican songwriters
 List of Puerto Ricans
 Music of Puerto Rico

References

External links 

 Vico C interview
 Vico C Biographic film directed by Eduardo Ortíz

1971 births
Living people
American people of Puerto Rican descent
Capitol Latin artists
Hip hop singers
Latin music songwriters
Puerto Rican rappers
Puerto Rican reggaeton musicians
Rappers from Brooklyn
Spanish-language singers of the United States
21st-century American rappers